Nigel Keane, also known as Hellstrike, is a fictional comic book superhero in the Stormwatch series, first appearing in Stormwatch #1. He possesses the ability to project plasma as destructive bolts or as an energy stream to allow himself to fly. As of Issue #12, he also has to live inside a containment suit similar to Fuji's.

Fictional character biography
Nigel is born Irish in Belfast. He serves in the British police constabulary in Belfast for some years before moving to London. There, he falls in love with Anne, his partner while investigating the IRA. Their relationship lasts until an Irish terrorist/mercenary by the name of Seamus O'Brien, kills her in front of him. In the ensuing fight, Keane is mortally wounded. But before dying, his powers manifest, saving his life and making him Hellstrike. O'Brien later became the villain Deathtrap, leader of the MERCs, a mercenary unit of super powered beings. Hellstrike bears a long grudge against Deathtrap for both this and Anne's murder.

Nigel joined StormWatch One, the main team of superheroes serving the UN. In the Wildstorm universe, the UN is secretly a menacing worldwide conspiracy led by gun-toting, paranoid "Secret Masters". While they are heroes, the operatives of StormWatch are quite ruthless and do not hesitate to violate the rights of a country in order to advance the agenda of the UN.

After a battle against Deathtrap, Hellstrike was severely injured, falls into coma and his neural circuitry began to fall apart. His body starts to lose cohesion and breaks into pure energy in a tremendous explosion that ruined Skywatch's sickbay. At this time, Nigel decides to give up his life. Then, Fuji contacted him in his comatose state and persuaded him that his life was still worth something, with Fuji using himself as an example. With the help of StormWatch engineering genius Link, Nigel received a tailor-made containment suit, much like Fuji's, except that Fuji's gives him the control of his own density and avoids radioactive gas leaks, while Hellstrike's acts as a force field preventing him from exploding.

He can manipulate it at will, such as when he learned he could grow genitalia, something he offered to show his teammates. They refused. Unfortunately, others can manipulate it, such as when the High grabs his chest and immobilized him.

Reformation
When Bendix reshapes StormWatch, Hellstrike was attached to StormWatch Prime under Winter's command. StormWatch Prime was the unit devoted to deal with superhuman threats in hotwar situations.

At some point, he began a relationship with Fahrenheit that they kept secret until Weatherman Battalion found out – it was contrary to regulations about fraternization between field officers. This was discovered when Battalion had to break into Hellstrike's quarters because neither he nor Lauren were responding to the radio calls.

Hellstrike is one of the four super-powered beings slain during an attack by Xenomorphs on Skywatch in the WildC.A.T.s/Aliens crossover, along with Fahrenheit, Fuji, and others.

Rebirth
Hellstrike and his other dead teammates return, partly detailed in the series Stormwatch: Post Human Division. The four play a support role to the PHD team, a compressed version of Stormwatch deeply affected by budget cuts. Hellstrike is featured in a flashback in issue #2 as Fahrenheit fondly recalls his assistance in a fight against the criminal known as 'The Walking Ghost'. Hellstrike later helps the PHD team escape the ice-encased precinct house they use as a headquarters.

In the Stormwatch PHD issue of Wildstorm: Armageddon, it is suggested that Hellstrike and his dead teammates were saved by a possible future version of Jackson King.

Hellstrike is seen rescuing humans in need in a post-apocalypse Earth. He is being pessimistic because the place they are evacuating the humans to is also suffering problems.

The New 52
In September 2011, The New 52 rebooted DC's continuity. In this new timeline, which merged the WildStorm and DC Universes, a version of Hellstrike having a different surname & ethnicity returns at the beginning of Jim Starlin's run (issue #19) of the third volume of Stormwatch. While not a member of the original team, Hellstrike appears as a member of the secondary group that forms after a time warp erases the original team from existence.

Powers and abilities
Hellstrike is a seedling (mutant), the people who were genetically affected by the Comet Effect of the 1960s. He is a living weapon of pure energy, what the scientist call a gaseous sentient posthuman entity. He can fire explosive plasma bolts, build a protective plasma shield and fly by means of his energy jet stream. Unfortunately, since one of his first missions, he has been bound to a containment suit that prevents him from dispersing. Hellstrike is immune to telepathy due to being more energy in nature than human.

Formerly a Scotland Yard inspector, he also proved to be a valuable asset in non-combat situation. Having operated initially in Northern Ireland, he is particularly good at counter-terrorism.

References

Characters created by Jim Lee
Fictional people from Northern Ireland
Fictional police officers in comics
Irish superheroes
Stormwatch and the Authority characters
Wildstorm Universe superheroes